Ceris or CERIS may refer to:

 CERIS, a beverage company of Cabo Berde
 Ceris Gilfillan, British racing cyclist

See also
 Ceres (disambiguation)
 Cerris
 Cerys
 Seris